Aakrosh is a 1998 Indian Hindi action crime thriller film directed by Lateef Binny starring Sunil Shetty, Shilpa Shetty.

Plot
Due to his illegal activities, Anjali Gujral separates from Mahendra Pratap Gujral, and marries Dr. Malhotra. She does bring up her son, Dev, from her first marriage, who grows up to become a Police Officer. Years later, on the tracks of Gujral, Dev, and his close colleague, Komal, comes across Suraj Singh, and find out that he is indeed Gujral. At this point, Gujral decides to play on Dev's emotions by reminding him of his past affection for him, and blaming his entire criminal career on a politician, Rajvansh Shashtri. Dev must now decide to go after Shastri, or disbelieve his father altogether.

Cast
Sunil Shetty as CBI Officer Dev Malhotra
Shilpa Shetty as Komal
Kulbhushan Kharbanda as CBI Chief Vikram Dutt
Johnny Lever as CBI Officer Gopi / Himself (Double Role) 
Navin Nischol as Dr. Malhotra
Anjana Mumtaz as Anjali Malhotra
Girish Karnad as Rajvansh Shastri
Suresh Oberoi as Mahendra Pratap Gujral / Suraj Singh
Mohan Joshi as Chauhan / Thakur
Ranjeet as Cyras
Shiva Rindani as Girdhari

Soundtrack

References

External links
 

1998 films
1998 crime thriller films
1990s crime action films
1998 action thriller films
1990s Hindi-language films
Films scored by Anand Raj Anand
Indian action thriller films
Indian crime action films
Indian crime thriller films
Hindi-language crime films